RCAF Station Davidson was a Second World War air training station located near Davidson, Saskatchewan, Canada.

History

World War II
The Royal Canadian Air Force (RCAF), opened No. 23 Elementary Flying Training School (EFTS) at RCAF Station Davidson on 9 November 1942. The school and station were a component of the British Commonwealth Air Training Plan. The school was relocated to RCAF Station Yorkton 19 January 1945 and the station was decommissioned shortly thereafter. No. 23 EFTS was the only RCAF operated EFTS in Canada, and was twice the size of all but 2 EFTS. The school produced 1,513 pilots of whom 973 were RCAF and 540 Royal Air Force.

Aerodrome information 
The airfield was constructed in the typical BCATP wartime pattern, with three runways formed in a triangle.
Three runways were under construction (serviceable) and listed as follows:

Relief landing field – Davidson West
The only relief landing field for RCAF Station Davidson was located west of the community of Davidson, Saskatchewan. The relief field was constructed in the typical triangular pattern but was listed on decommissioning of the facility as a turf all way field. The cost to develop the aerodrome was $60,673.39. The aerodrome was located on approximately 78 acres of the south west quarter of section 36 in township 26 in range 1, west of the 3rd meridian. The aerodrome was declared surplus on 15 June 1945 and was officially turned over to the Department of Transportation on 31 October 1945.

Other occupants 
The RCAF Women's Division arrived at the school on 17 May 1943.

No. 205 Reserve Equipment Maintenance Satellite was established at the Station on 1 April 1945.

Postwar

Current status
All that remains are cement foundations and the gun butt. From a survey of the location on google maps on 8 Jun 2018 it appears that two of the three runways are badly deteriorated with the last in better condition.  several buildings appear to have been built on the old runways.

See also
Davidson, Saskatchewan
Davidson Municipal Airport

References

External links
Bruce Forsyth's Canadian Military History Page

Davidson
Military airbases in Saskatchewan
Canadian Forces bases in Canada (closed)
Davidson
Defunct airports in Saskatchewan
Military history of Saskatchewan